Sportclub Amersfoort was a Dutch football club based in Amersfoort, Utrecht. It was founded on July 30, 1973, and played in the Dutch second league of professional football, Eerste Divisie.

Due to financial problems the club ceased to operate on June 30, 1982.

Defunct football clubs in the Netherlands
Association football clubs established in 1973
Association football clubs disestablished in 1982
1973 establishments in the Netherlands
1982 disestablishments in the Netherlands
Football clubs in Amersfoort

References